Calliostoma philippei is a species of sea snail, a marine gastropod mollusk in the family Calliostomatidae.

Description
The size of the shell varies between 8 mm and 17 mm.

Distribution
This marine species occurs off the Philippines.

References

 Poppe G.T. (2004) Descriptions of spectacular new species from the Philippines (Gastropoda - Trochidae, Cypraeidae). Visaya 1(1): 4–19.

External links
 

philippei
Gastropods described in 2004